Pereiro may refer to:

People with the surname
Bernardo Romero Pereiro (1944–2005), Colombian actor, director, and writer
Gastón Pereiro (born 1995), Uruguayan footballer who plays as an attacking midfielder
Guillermo Méndez Pereiro (born 1992), Spanish footballer who plays as a forward
Lois Pereiro (1958–1996), Galician poet and writer
Moisés Pereiro (born 1980), Spanish footballer who plays as a midfielder
Óscar Pereiro (born 1977), former Spanish road bicycle racer

Places
Pereiro, Ceará, Brazil
Pereiro (Alcoutim), Portugal
Pereiro de Palhacana, Portugal
O Pereiro de Aguiar, Ourense, Spain

See also
Pereira (disambiguation)